John Somer BD (d. 28 November 1573) was a Canon of Windsor from 1554 to 1573

Career

He was appointed:
Rector of Stanlake, Oxford 1542
Rector of Stoke Hammond, Buckinghamshire 1565
Prebendary of Lincoln 1546

He was appointed to the eighth stall in St George's Chapel, Windsor Castle in 1554 and held the canonry until 1573.

Notes 

1573 deaths
Canons of Windsor
Year of birth unknown